Frank Ganzera (born 8 September 1947, in Dresden) is former East German footballer who played as a right-back. He played in the DDR Oberliga for Dynamo Dresden where he was East German champion in 1971 and 1973. He also won the FDGB Cup in 1971. For the GDR national team he played 13 times between 1969 and 1973 and was part of the bronze-medal-winning team at the 1972 Summer Olympics in Munich.

References

External links
 
 
 
 

1947 births
Living people
German footballers
East German footballers
Dynamo Dresden players
Footballers at the 1972 Summer Olympics
Olympic footballers of East Germany
Olympic bronze medalists for East Germany
East Germany international footballers
Olympic medalists in football
DDR-Oberliga players
Medalists at the 1972 Summer Olympics
Association football defenders
Footballers from Dresden
People from Bezirk Dresden